The Konya Plain is a plain in the Central Anatolia Region of Turkey, associated with the Konya Province. It is a flat plain (a height of 900–1050 m) that covers the majority of Konya Basin and constitutes the main part of the Central Anatolian Plateau.

The plain is one of the driest areas in Turkey. To alleviate it, a major irrigational Konya Plain Project was launched in 2012. The project includes 14 irrigation, three potable water and one energy investments, including the Blue Tunnel Project and the Bagbasi Dam.

The plain is of considerable archaeological interest, including an important neolithic archaeological site of Çatalhöyük is located within the plain.

Archaeology 
Oriental Institute archaeologists unearthed a lost ancient kingdom dating to 1400 B.C to 600 B.C near the Türkmen-Karahöyük site in 2020 which might be connected to Tarḫuntašša, and its king Hartapu. The script written in Luwian Hieroglyphs about Hartapu's victory over Phrygia translated by OI scholars was discovered in 2019 by University of Chicago and Konya Regional Archaeological Survey Project.

References

Landforms of Konya Province